Mario Ermirio de Moraes Filho (born December 20, 1988 in São Paulo) is a Brazilian professional race car driver. Moraes started his career in minor youth motorsports. In 2003 Moraes competed in American Formula Renault with World Speed Motorsports and won races against some competition such as Marco Andretti. In 2005 he drove for the Bassan Motorsport team in Formula Three Sudamericana and finished eighth. In 2006 he finished second in F3 Sudamericana, then moved to the British Formula Three National Class driving for Carlin Motorsport and earned several good finishes while not competing for series points. He finished in 14th place in the 2007 British Formula Three championship's Championship Class, again competing for Carlin.

In 2008, he drove in the IndyCar Series for Dale Coyne Racing. He finished 21st in points with a best finish of seventh at Watkins Glen International.

Moraes drove for KV Racing Technology in 2009, with a best finish as third at Chicagoland.

Motorsports career results

American open–wheel results
(key) (Races in bold indicate pole position)

IndyCar

 1 Run on same day.
 2 Non-points race.

Indianapolis 500 results

References

External links
Bio at KV Racing website
World Speed Motorsports - Moraes first American racecar team

1988 births
Brazilian racing drivers
North American Formula Renault drivers
British Formula Three Championship drivers
IndyCar Series drivers
Brazilian IndyCar Series drivers
Indianapolis 500 drivers
Racing drivers from São Paulo
Formula 3 Sudamericana drivers
Living people
Brazilian expatriate sportspeople in the United States
Carlin racing drivers
KV Racing Technology drivers
Dale Coyne Racing drivers